Maria Gomes can refer to:
Maria Teresinha Gomes (1933–2007), Portuguese woman who nearly 20 years pretended to be a male army general
Maria Carneiro Pereira Gomes, Brazilian first lady
Maria Eugénia Varela Gomes, campaigner against the authoritarian Estado Novo government in Portugal
Ana Maria Gomes (born 1954), Portuguese politician, Member of the European Parliament since 2004
Maria Amélia Gomes Barros da Lomba do Amaral, known as Amélia da Lomba (born 1961), Angolan writer and journalist
Rosa Maria Gomes de Lima (born 1964), Brazilian retired footballer
Maria Gomes (badminton), 4-times champion in Portuguese National Badminton Championships 1990–93
Jesuina Maria Ferreira Gomes (active since 1990s), Brazilian politician
Abi-Maria Gomes, got 5th place in Survivor: Philippines in 2012
Maria Gomes Da Silva, Angolan blind runner, see Angola at the 2012 Summer Paralympics

See also 
Fernão Pires, Portuguese wine grape also known as Maria Gomes